Mädajõgi is a river in Põlva and Võru County, Estonia. The river is 31 km long and basin size is 245.4 km2. It runs into Võhandu River.

References

Rivers of Estonia
Põlva County
Võru County